Ali Reza Azari (born 12 June 1968) is an Iranian weightlifter. He competed in the men's light heavyweight event at the 1992 Summer Olympics.

References

External links
 

1968 births
Living people
Iranian male weightlifters
Olympic weightlifters of Iran
Weightlifters at the 1992 Summer Olympics
Place of birth missing (living people)